Semaq Beri (Semoq Beri) is an Austroasiatic language spoken in the Malay Peninsula in the states of Pahang and Terengganu. It belongs to the Southern division of the Aslian languages, along with Semelai, Temoq, and Mah Meri. A preliminary description of the Semaq Beri language by Nicole Kruspe was published in 2014.

References

External links
http://projekt.ht.lu.se/rwaai RWAAI (Repository and Workspace for Austroasiatic Intangible Heritage)
http://hdl.handle.net/10050/00-0000-0000-0003-66DE-7@view Semaq Beri in RWAAI Digital Archive

Languages of Malaysia
Aslian languages